Tom Tomorrow is the pen name of editorial cartoonist Dan Perkins (born April 5, 1961, in Wichita, Kansas). His weekly comic strip, This Modern World, which comments on current events, appears regularly in more than 80 newspapers across the United States and Canada as of 2015, as well as in The Nation, The Nib, Truthout, and the Daily Kos, where he was the former comics curator  and now is a regular contributor. His work has appeared in The New York Times, The New Yorker, Spin, Mother Jones, Esquire, The Economist, Salon, The American Prospect, CREDO Action, and AlterNet.

Career
Perkins was first published in the San Francisco-based anarchist magazine Processed World. He adopted the subject matter of the consumer culture and the drudgery of work, a theme shared by the magazine, and entitled his comic strip This Modern World when it was launched in 1988. (Like many of the magazine's contributors he adopted a pseudonym to avoid retribution from potential employers.)

In 1990, the strip began to be run in the SF Weekly, before being picked up in the fall of 1991 by the San Francisco Examiner. During this time of expanding audiences for Perkins, he shifted the focus of his work to politics. Perkins added papers throughout the 1990s, distributing his comic via self-syndication, a practice he has continued throughout his career.

In 1998, Perkins was asked by editor James Fallows to contribute a bi-weekly cartoon to U.S. News & World Report, but was fired less than six months later, reportedly at the direction of owner Mort Zuckerman.

In 1999, Perkins had an animation deal with Saturday Night Live and produced three animated spots that were never aired. In 2000 and 2001, his online animated series was the top-billed attraction in Mondo Media's lineup of mini-shows, in which the voice of Sparky the Penguin was provided by Jeopardy! champion and author Bob Harris. Perkins has also collaborated with Michael Moore, according to a 2005 interview with the Santa Cruz Metro.

In December 2007, Keith Olbermann devoted the closing segment of an episode of his show to a reading of "Bill O'Reilly's Very Useful Advice for Young People", a two-page cartoon-cover story by Perkins for The Village Voice.

In 2009, Village Voice Media, publishers of 16 alternative weeklies, suspended all syndicated cartoons across their entire chain. Perkins thereby lost twelve client papers in cities including Los Angeles, Minneapolis, New York, and Seattle, prompting his friend Eddie Vedder to post an open letter on the Pearl Jam website in support of the cartoonist. Vedder and Perkins had become friends after meeting at a campaign rally for Ralph Nader in 2000. The collaboration between Pearl Jam and Perkins continued with an invitation to submit cover art for the Backspacer album in 2009. After being selected to provide the cover art for Backspacer, Perkins went on to create a series of Halloween-themed posters for the concerts supporting the album.

In 2015, Perkins was a finalist for the Pulitzer Prize and later in the year, ran a Kickstarter campaign that raised more than $300,000 to publish a career retrospective, 25 Years of Tomorrow.

This Modern World

This Modern World is Perkins' ongoing comic strip that has been published continually for more than 31 years. While it often ridicules those in power, the strip also focuses on the average American's support for contemporary leaders and their policies, as well as the popular media's role in shaping public perception.

In addition to any politicians and celebrities depicted, the strip has several recurring characters:
 A sunglasses-wearing penguin named "Sparky" and his Boston terrier friend, "Blinky"
 "Biff", a generic conservative often used by Sparky as a foil
 "Conservative Jones", a boy detective whose deductive reasoning satirizes the logic of conservative news analysts and politicians
 The tentacle-waving aliens of planet Glox
 The "Small Cute Dog", who was accidentally elected president on "parallel earth", and whose subsequent actions mirrored those of President George W. Bush
 The "Invisible Hand of the Free Market Man", a superhero figure whose head is shaped like a human hand

In September 2001, he began his blog, also called This Modern World.

Personal life
Perkins, a longtime resident of both San Francisco and Brooklyn, lives in New York City according to his Twitter bio.

Works and publications 
Anthologies of This Modern World
 
 
 
 
 
  – a large omnibus of early work and selected strips
 
 
 
 
  – includes pre-Modern World material
 
 

Children's picture book
  – a picture book for children aged 4–8

Awards
 1993 Media Alliance Meritorious Achievement Award (MAMA)
 1995 Society of Professional Journalists James Madison Freedom of Information Award
 1998 Robert F. Kennedy Journalism Award, Cartoon, for This Modern World
 2000 Association for Education in Journalism and Education, Professional Freedom and Responsibility Award
 2001 James Aronson Award for Social Justice Journalism
 2003 Robert F. Kennedy Journalism Award, Cartoon, for This Modern World
 2004 AltWeekly Award, Cartoon (More than five papers), 2nd Place, for This Modern World
 2006 AltWeekly Award, Cartoon (Four or more papers), 3rd Place, for This Modern World
 2013 Herblock Prize for editorial cartooning
 2014 Association of Alternative Newsmedia second place award for cartooning
 2015 First Place, Cartoon category, Association of Alternative Newsmedia (AAN) Awards 
 2015 Comic Strip Gold Medal in the Society of Illustrators' Comic and Cartoon Art Annual competition
 2015 Pulitzer Prize for Editorial Cartooning finalist

References

External links 

 
 Buzzflash Interview: Tom Tomorrow, Author of "This Modern World"
 Beyond Chron Profile: Tom Tomorrow
 Debunking Thomas Friedman's "I lost my job to India and all I got was this lousy T-shirt" story.

1961 births
Living people
American bloggers
American editorial cartoonists
American political writers
American male non-fiction writers
American comics artists
American satirists
American political blogs
Artists from Wichita, Kansas
Pseudonymous artists
Writers from Wichita, Kansas
21st-century American non-fiction writers
American male bloggers